Kiwaia monophragma is a moth in the family Gelechiidae. It was described by Edward Meyrick in 1886. It is found in New Zealand.

The wingspan is 11–15 mm. The forewings are ochreous whitish, somewhat irrorated (sprinkled) with ochreous and with a narrow blackish central streak from the base to the apex, sometimes suffused with ochreous beneath, variable in strength, rarely partially obsolete, and tending to form two separate discal spots towards the middle. The hindwings are pale whitish grey.

References

Kiwaia
Moths described in 1886
Moths of New Zealand
Taxa named by Edward Meyrick
Endemic fauna of New Zealand
Endemic moths of New Zealand